is a Japanese manga series by Masaharu Nabeshima with art by Mitsuo Hashimoto. It has been adapted into a 2008 Japanese film directed by Shingo Matsubara. The film  was intended to be part of a series.

Film

Cast
Takao Osawa (Shuntaro Akagi)	
Rena Tanaka (Asuka)
Tsuyoshi Ihara		
Yoko Moriguchi
Shirō Itō
Akira Emoto

Reception
The film was released in Japan on 259 theaters and has made US$2,234,531 at the box office. It is one of the films in competition for the Golden Cup award for best film at the 2008 Shanghai International Film Festival.

References

External links
 Official website of the film 
 
 

Cooking in anime and manga
2000 manga
Seinen manga
Tsukiji
Manga adapted into films
Live-action films based on manga
2008 films
Shochiku films
Japanese comedy films